The Fujinon XF 35mm F2 R WR is an interchangeable standard prime lens for X-mount, announced by Fujifilm on October 21, 2015.

References

35
Camera lenses introduced in 2015